Richards Bay Airport  is an airport in Richards Bay, South Africa.

Overview
It is independently managed and not part of the network of larger airports operated by the parastatal Airports Company South Africa (ACSA). The Airport is managed by Indiza Airport Management. The Airport is also home to one of the only aviation maintenances companies in the Northern Natal Province, Alton Aero Engineering. South African Airlink currently fly the only scheduled flight service in and out of Richards Bay, using a fleet of Embraer E170 jet and BAe Jetstream 41 aircraft.

In late 2011, after much speculation, it was confirmed that the airport would undergo a major upgrade that would render the airport's status as International. The expansion project however, has been put on hold pending an outcome to the issue of the local township of Mandlanzini, with residents having settled in the path of the intended runway extension.

Airlines and destinations

Traffic statistics

References

External links
 Aerial photograph on Google Maps

Airports in South Africa
Richards Bay
Transport in KwaZulu-Natal
Buildings and structures in KwaZulu-Natal